Irwin Elliot Smigel (October 9, 1924 – October 17, 2016) was an American aesthetic dentist, innovator and philanthropist.

Smigel founded the American Society for Dental Aesthetics (ASDA), and was President of the ASDA until his death in 2016. Smigel was involved with many major developments in dentistry over the past three decades, including: tooth bonding, laminates, veneers, changing facial structures and teeth whitening. New York University College of Dentistry dubbed him "The Father of Aesthetic Dentistry" in 2000. In 2009, The National Museum of Dentistry, an affiliate of the Smithsonian Institution, created a permanent exhibition called The Smile Experience celebrating Dr. Smigel's contributions to dentistry.

Smigel and his wife, Lucia Smigel, have two children, the writer/comedian Robert Smigel and Bellanca Smigel Rutter, and six grandsons. He died in Manhattan from pneumonia on October 17, 2016.

Career
Smigel graduated from the New York University College of Dentistry in 1950. In the late 1970s Smigel appeared on  ABC's "That's Incredible" where he performed "live" tooth-bonding on a patient for the first time on national television. He was called the "pioneer of tooth-bonding" on that show.

Later years
Smigel practiced on Madison Avenue in New York City and was a visiting lecturer for several postgraduate aesthetic dentistry programs, including the University of Minnesota Dental School, SUNY School of Dentistry – Buffalo, University of Missouri Dental School, Case Western University and the Baylor University School of Dentistry. He lectured throughout the country to practicing dentists and worldwide in countries including India, Korea, Israel, Turkey, Japan, South America, Canada. The Irwin and Lucia Smigel Fund was created to allow young professional actors and performers who could not afford aesthetic dentistry to obtain this type of dental work at The New York University College of Dentistry.

Publications
 
Numerous articles in Dentistry Today and many other dental trade journals.

Honors
American Academy of Cosmetic Dentistry, 1994: Outstanding Contribution to Aesthetic Dentistry Award.

New York University College of Dentistry creation of the Irwin Smigel Prize in Aesthetic Dentistry presented to dentists for outstanding contributions to the world of aesthetic dentistry.

In June 2009, the National Museum of Dentistry, an affiliate of the Smithsonian Institution, honored Smigel in a new historical exhibition called The Smile Experience.

References

 

1924 births
2016 deaths
American dentists
20th-century American Jews
New York University alumni
American dentistry academics
20th-century dentists
21st-century American Jews